Wyman Dam is a hydroelectric dam in Somerset County, Maine.

The dam was built in 1930 and connects the southwest corner of the town of Moscow with the southeast corner of Pleasant Ridge Plantation. Owned and operated by NextEra Energy, one of six of their hydroelectric facilities on the Kennebec River, it's named in honor of Walter Wyman, the president of the original builder Central Maine Power Company. The dam's power plant houses three 24 MW turbine generators.

Wyman Lake, the riverine reservoir formed by the dam, contains , among the largest lakes in Maine.  Its normal surface area is over five square miles. It stretches northward from the dam, and forms the border between not only Moscow and Pleasant Ridge Plantation, but also between the town of Caratunk and Northwest Somerset.

References

External links 

 online archive of historic materials, texts, photos, etc.

Dams in Maine
Reservoirs in Maine
United States power company dams
Buildings and structures in Somerset County, Maine
Embankment dams
Hydroelectric power plants in Maine
Dams completed in 1930
Energy infrastructure completed in 1930
NextEra Energy
Lakes of Somerset County, Maine